"Six Months, Three Days" is a science fiction novelette by Charlie Jane Anders. It was originally published online on Tor.com in 2011, and was subsequently reprinted in Some of the Best from Tor.com: 2011 Edition and Year's Best SF 17. It won the 2012 Hugo Award for Best Novelette.

In October 2017 Tor.com published "Six Months, Three Days" in Anders' short fiction collection, Six Months, Three Days, Five Others.

Plot
Doug and Judy are both precognitive: Doug can see "the future", and Judy can see "many possible futures". They fall in love, even though they both know that their relationship will last exactly six months and three days and end very badly.

Background
Anders said in a 2016 interview that in this novelette "[t]he big challenge for me ... was how to have a satisfying resolution" to the which-future-is-right question: "they can’t both be right, but they kind of both are right, and how does that work?" In another 2016 interview, Anders commented that her decision to make her 2016 novel, All the Birds in the Sky a "relationship story" was influenced by the relationship that she had created in Six Months, Three Days.

Reception
The story was a finalist for the Nebula Award for Best Novelette of 2011 and the 2011 Theodore Sturgeon Award; it won the 2012 Hugo Award for Best Novelette.

Rachel Swirsky described the story as a "philosophical contrast" between determinism and free will. Jim C. Hines said Anders' resolution to the fixed vs. multiple futures conflict was "simultaneously tragic and scary and hopeful", but added that it "felt right for the story".

In 2013, Deadline Hollywood announced that a television adaptation was being prepared for NBC, with script written by Eric Garcia.

References

External links
Text of the story at Tor.com

Hugo Award for Best Novelette winning works
2011 short stories
Short stories by Charlie Jane Anders
Works originally published in online magazines
Tor Books books